Saa or SAA may refer to:

Languages
 Saa language, a language of Vanuatu
 Saba language (ISO 639 code: saa)

Law
 Space Act Agreement, a type of legal agreement with NASA
 Stabilisation and Association Process, for countries seeking to join the European Union

Organizations

Armed forces
 Anbar Salvation Council, a collection of tribal militias in the Al Anbar province of Iraq
 South African Army
 Syrian Arab Army, the land force branch of the Syrian Armed Forces

Companies
 Saudi Arabian Airlines, now known as Saudia
 Shanghai Airport Authority
 South African Airways

Professional and trade associations
 Society for American Archaeology
 Society of American Archivists
 Stock Artists Alliance, a trade association of photographers
 Sub-Aqua Association, a diver training organization in the UK

Schools
 Sainte Agathe Academy, a primary and secondary school in Sainte-Agathe-des-Monts, Quebec
 Savannah Arts Academy, a Georgia, US high school
 Spencerville Adventist Academy, a Seventh-day Adventist school in Silver Spring, Maryland
 School of American Archaeology, since 2007 known as the School for Advanced Research

Other organizations
 Sex Addicts Anonymous, an addiction recovery program
 South Australian Association, which promoted the British Colonisation of South Australia
 Southern Athletic Association, a U.S. college athletic conference
 Specialist Anglers Alliance (UK), now part of the Angling Trust
 Spondylitis Association of America
 Standards Australia, a standards organisation established in 1922

People
 The Rodríguez Saá family of Argentina, including:
 Adolfo Rodríguez Saá (born 1947) ex-interim President of Argentina
 Adolfo Rodríguez Saá (elder) (born 19th century), Argentine politician
 Alberto Rodríguez Saá (born 1949) Argentinian politician
 Nicolás Rodríguez Saá (born 1984), Argentinian national deputy
 Ricardo Rodríguez Saá, Argentinian politician
 Carlos Saa (born 1983), Colombian soccer player
 Diego Saa (born 1980), Ecuadorian politician
 Saa Emerson Lamina, Sierra Leonean politician

Places

Transportation facilities
 Saattut Heliport (non-IATA location identifier: SAA) in Saattut, Greenland
 Shively Field (IATA airport identifier: SAA) in Saratoga, Wyoming, US
 St Albans Abbey railway station, in St Albans, Hertfordshire, UK
 Stockholm-Arlanda Airport, Sweden

Other places
 Saa, Benin, a town and arrondissement in Benin
 Saa, Cameroon, a town in the Centre Province of Cameroon
 Saar (protectorate) (IOC country code used from 1952 until 1956 when the Saarland rejoined Germany)
 Shaanxi, a province of China (Guobiao abbreviation SAA)
 South Atlantic Anomaly, a magnetic anomaly in the South Atlantic Ocean

Science and technology

Computing
 Service Assurance Agent, used for Network Management
 Stateless Address Autoconfiguration; see IPv6
 Systems Application Architecture, an interface standard by IBM

Medicine
 Serum amyloid A
 Severe aplastic anemia
 Spondylitis Association of America
 Steroidal antiandrogen, a type of antiandrogen medication

Spaceflight
 Solar aspect angle or beta angle, in orbital spaceflight
 South Atlantic Anomaly, a magnetic anomaly in the South Atlantic Ocean
 Space Act Agreement, a type of legal agreement with NASA

Other technologies
 Colt Single Action Army, a revolver

Other uses 
 Sia (god), also called Saa, the deification of wisdom in Egyptian mythology

See also

 
 
 SAA2
 SAA4
 Saas (disambiguation)
 SA2 (disambiguation)
 SA (disambiguation)